Matir Agunot (Unchained,) is a 2019 Israeli drama television series on the lives of Jewish women who face complex divorce proceedings, where men may refuse to divorce leading to women being "chained" to their marriage. The show ran for one season and included twelve episodes.

The series protagonist is Rabbi Yosef Morad (Aviv Alush) who acts as a detective to investigate "chained marriages". Mord's task is to convince the husbands who have separated or even abandoned their wives not to leave them in their marital state but rather to divorce them. Elush's character is based on the real-life story of Rabbi Eliyahu Maimon. Morad is married to Hannah (Avigail Kovari) and soon discovers she is hiding secrets from him.

See also 
 Shtisel

References 

Films about Orthodox and Hasidic Jews